Weardrobe is an online street fashion community for both novice and established bloggers and allows members to share their outfits and comment on others' photographs.

History
The idea for the community originated in a University of Chicago dorm room in September 2004, where Weardrobe co-founder Suzanne Xie kept track of everything she had in her closet via a Microsoft Excel spreadsheet. In late 2007, she along with friend and co-founder Rich Tong, noted that there was no application to organize clothing online and began discussing the possibility of developing such a forum. Their discussions spawned the basis for Weardrobe, and the site officially went online in January 2008.

In 2009, Weardrobe was named one of 20 winners of Facebook's fbFund Competition for startups and nonprofit companies, and was invited to participate in Facebook's Summer Incubator Program in Palo Alto, California. There, Xie and Tong worked on integrating Facebook Connect with the online fashion network so users could see which of their friends were on the site and include those friends' activity through Facebook news feeds.

The founders also created a partnership with Urban Outfitters where the company sends clothing out to specific Weardrobe users. The individuals then post images of the items styled to their preference, before sending the clothing back to the company.

On November 18, 2009, the community was acquired by Like.com. Accordingly, the site has undergone several changes, including the addition of search functionality that allows readers to find and purchase similar articles of clothing if they so desire. Subsequently, like.com was acquired by Google on August 20, 2010 for a rumored price of $100,000. The reasoning is said to be for the strength of visual search within the database of Like.com, which now supports Boutiques.com.

Features
Weardrobe provides members with the opportunity to create their own user profiles and post photographs of themselves. Members can create and view a virtual representation of their real-life closet by tagging clothing in the images that they upload to the site and translating those articles into color-coded items for organizational purposes.

One of the site's most recently added features is an extension of Likesense (Like.com's visual search capabilities). It aesthetically identifies items in a given outfit photograph, culls similar ones from one of Like.com's 5000 suppliers, and then displays the results to the user with the option for them to purchase those articles. This allows people to easily buy replicas of clothing that they see and like in the site's photographs, even though the piece in the outfit might have originally been a vintage one-of-a-kind. Likesense first displays two items, and if one of the two is clicked, further variations on that piece of clothing are shown. Currently, it only runs this process on the front page, which displays daily featured looks; however, there are plans to expand so that the entire site will eventually be searchable with Like.com.

Community
On occasion, the site sponsors contests in which members submit photographs of outfits based on given themes. Sometimes, Weardrobe pairs up with other fashion-related sites such as Modcloth and Market Publique - both online vintage American retailers - to offer different prizes for winning. Weardrobe's collaboration with Modcloth, the Mod Honor Roll Contest, asked for members' favorite back-to-school inspired outfits; the prize for the top three submissions included a special Modcloth outfit that the bloggers then styled and modeled. Their collaboration with Market Publique, Time After Time, asked for vintage-inspired outfit entries and the winner was flown into Brooklyn for a photo shoot session with Market Publique. Modcloth also held another competition in which they supplied the New York City Weardrobe community with a vintage black Modcloth dress (called the "Weardrobe Dress") and asked the members to come up with ways to style it. The dress was a simple black garment, and contestants submitted photos of how they would style an outfit around the piece. In its collaboration with other fashion-focused sites, Weardrobe provides a platform where people interested in fashion can come together and demonstrate their creativity and knowledge. It also provides an outlet for fashion-related sites to show off their clothing items to a specified online niche with similar interests.

Weardrobe Conference
In early September 2009, Weardrobe sponsored a conference in New York City for 19 popular fashion bloggers - many of whom have been featured in Teen Vogue, New York Magazine, and Lucky Magazine. There, the bloggers participated in a DIY (Do It Yourself) exercise in customizing a pair of Solana Extreme Skinny Jeans, which were voted the #1 Jean of the Summer by Seventeen Magazine for 2009. The conference was meant to create a space for some of the fashion industry's most active style bloggers (including the minds behind the sites Style Rookie, Calivintage, The Clothes Horse, The Glamourai, What I Wore, This Time Tomorrow, and Fashion is Poison) to collaborate and exchange ideas about fashion.

Notable Members

Weardrobe has previously been known to hire staff from among their notable members, including Krystal Bick from This Time Tomorrow, who acted as the site's community manager, and Jessica Quirk of the blog What I Wore, who served as community director and also did some creative work, including writing and illustrating weekly contest images. Since the launch of her online blogging career, Quirk has also written a book entitled What I Wore: Four Seasons, One Closet, Endless Recipes for Personal Style, in which she answers frequently asked style questions, features several of her own favorite outfits and illustrations, and gives tips for organizing a closet.

Similar Websites
There are other sites with similar features and goals to Weardrobe, such as Closet Couture. Weardrobe contributors are sometimes also contributors on Chictopia or Lookbook. The two communities, like Weardrobe, offer "the common fashionista" the ability to publicly post their looks to an online community of people interested in fashion. The sites also contain photo blogs and competitions for online contributors.

References

Fashion websites
Internet properties established in 2008